United States v. Brown or U.S. v. Brown may refer to:
 United States Supreme Court cases
 United States v. Brown (1907),  – concerning the status of military officers given leave to accept other military offices, and its effect on courts-martial
 United States v. Brown (1948),  – "strict construction of penal statutes is not an inexorable command to override common sense and evident statutory purpose"
 United States v. Brown (1954),  – Tort Claims Act allowed veterans to sue for Veterans Administration negligence even though also covered under the Veterans Act
 United States v. Brown (1962),  (per curiam)
 United States v. Brown (1965),  – unconstitutional to prohibit "Communist Party members" from being labor union leaders under Taft–Hartley Act